Hudson is a census-designated place (CDP) located at the westernmost end of Pasco County, Florida,  United States, and is included in the Tampa-St. Petersburg-Clearwater, Florida Metropolitan Statistical Area.  As of the 2010 census, Hudson's population was 12,158.

History
In 1878, Isaac Hudson moved his family to the uninhabited brush of coastal Pasco County and allowed a post office to be established in his home. The town grew in the early twentieth century when the Fivay Company  began cutting lumber and shipping it by rail to Tampa. Hudson stagnated when the Fivay Company went out of business in 1912 and people turned to the sea or moved away; shrimping and fishing employed about half of the working men in the 1930s to 1950s.

W.L. Hendry came with his sons from Tampa and began digging inlets from the coast around Hudson Springs, using the fill to create a higher ground to put a few houses on in 1950. This was to become the Port of Hudson neighborhood. In the 1980s, people began building larger homes (most of which were mobile homes) along the canals. Now, while its older waterfront is reviving, large residential developments are spreading inland.

Bayonet Point Medical Center, located in Hudson Florida, is the areas local hospital. Founded in 1981, it was the first hospital to be built in North West Pasco County serving residents in Pasco, Hernando and Citrus counties.

Geography

Demographics

As of the census of 2010, there were 12,158 people, 5,816 households, and 3,466 families residing in Hudson. There were 7,686 housing units, at an average density of 1,207.5/sq. mi. (465.9/km). The racial makeup was 96.87% White, 0.36% Black, 0.22% American Indian, 0.91% Asian, 0.03% Pacific Islander, 0.42% from other races, and 1.19% from two or more races. Hispanic or Latino of any race comprised 2.60% of the population.

There were 5,816 households, out of which 13.8% had children under the age of 18 living with them, 54.2% were married couples living together, 6.4% had a female householder with no husband present, and 36.2% were nonfamilies. 30.4% of all households were made up of individuals, and 19.0% had someone living alone who was 65 years of age or older. The average household size was 2.04, and the average family size was 2.47.

In Hudson, 12.9% of the population were under the age of 18, 4.0% from 18 to 24, 17.1% from 25 to 44, 27.4% from 45 to 64, and 38.6% who were 65 years of age or older; the median age was 57 years. For every 100 females, there were 93.3 males, and for every 100 women age 18 and over, there were 91.2 men.

The median income for a household in Hudson was $33,177, and the median income for a family was $39,708. Men had a median income of $30,688, versus $24,620 for women; the per capita income was $19,476. About 5.5% of families and 9.9% of the population were below the poverty line, including 12.3% of those under age 18 and 8.1% of those age 65 or over.

Parks and recreation
Robert J. Strickland Memorial Park (Hudson Beach) was built in the 1960s and is the main beach for the Hudson community. Several restaurants in the area offer water views of the gulf or adjacent canals.

Veterans Memorial Park and Arthur F. Engle Memorial Park are the main indoor and outdoor sports and recreation centers, with indoor gymnasiums, outdoor fields and an outdoor pool (at Veterans Memorial Park).

There are also three semiprivate golf courses: Beacon Woods Golf Club, Meadow Oaks Golf & Country Club, and Heritage Pines Country Club.

Hudson once proclaimed itself the "gopher racing capital of the world".

References

Further reading
 Littell C P, Ash, Pauline and Knowles, Brenda, 'Early Settlers of Hudson,' (pamphlet) c. 1978
 Dill, Glen, 'Suncoast Past,' c. 1987.
 Horgan, James, 'Historic Places of Pasco County,' c.1992.
 Miller, Harry, 'The Story of Hudson.' (pamphlet) c. 1973.
 Obenreder, Julia, and others, 'West Pasco's Heritage,' c. 1974.
 Tamm, David, 'Hudson Beach: Portrait of a Community in Flux' c. 2004
 Hawk, 'Hmm, Yes yes yes yes yes yes!' c. 2008
 Cannon, Jeff, 'Images of America: Hudson' c 2009

External links
 Hudson, Florida
 History of Hudson

Census-designated places in Pasco County, Florida
Census-designated places in Florida
Populated coastal places in Florida on the Gulf of Mexico